() is a variety of hoe dish of rolled and tied ribbons made with blanched vegetables such as minari (Oeananthe javanica) and silpa (thread scallions). Sometimes, the vegetables are bundled into ribbons, while other times, they are tied around layered ingredients such as pyeonyuk (pressed meat slices), egg garnish, and chili threads or blanched seafood (called sukhoe). Vegetarian versions are a part of Korean temple cuisine. Ganghoe is usually dipped in chojang, the mixture made of gochujang and vinegar.

Varieties 
  – Raw coriander is bundled and eaten with chojang (dipping sauce made with gochujang and vinegar).
  – Fresh Indian cress leaves, stems, and sees are bundled and served with in gochujang.
  – Blanched minari (Oenanthe javanica) is tied around a -thick piece of pyeonyuk (pressed meat) or white part of daepa (big scallions), that is topped with chili threads and a pine nut. It is commonly served as anju or banchan.
  – Blanched silpa (thread scallions) are tied around pyeonyuk, that is topped with a pine nut.
  – Blanched silpa is bundled into ribbons and served with chojang.
  – Blanched crown daisy greens are bundled into ribbons and served with chojang.

Gallery

See also
 Sukhoe
 List of rolled foods

References 

Korean vegetable dishes